Six Flags Dubai was a planned theme park under development for multiple years in Dubai, United Arab Emirates. The park was being developed by DXB Entertainments, under license from Six Flags. The park was scheduled to open in November 2011, but Six Flags terminated the agreement in 2010 after Tatweer failed to make a payment owed to Six Flags. It was later revived and scheduled to open in 2019 near Lapita Hotel and Riverland Dubai at Dubai Parks and Resorts. It was to be divided into six themed sections, and contain 27 different attractions, including six roller coasters. On April 25, 2019, DXB Entertainments issued a statement that the project had been cancelled.

Areas
Six Flags Dubai was to be laid out in six different areas, much like the original concepts of Six Flags Over Texas, Six Flags Over Georgia, and Six Flags St. Louis, the three original parks built by the company. Six Flags Dubai's themed areas were to be based on other Six Flags theme parks in the United States that were acquired from other companies.

Thrillseeker Plaza
The main area of the park, with pathways leading to the five other areas.

Magic Mountain
Themed after Six Flags Magic Mountain in Valencia, California.

Fiesta Texas
Themed after Six Flags Fiesta Texas in San Antonio, Texas.

Great Escape
Themed after Great Escape in Queensbury, New York.

Great Adventure
Themed after Six Flags Great Adventure in Jackson, New Jersey.

Great America
Themed after Six Flags Great America in Gurnee, Illinois.

History

Original development (2008-2010)
In March 2008, Dubai Holdings, Inc. and Six Flags announced a corporate marketing alliance that would allow Tatweer, a member of Dubai Holdings, Inc., to lease the exclusive right to the Six Flags brand name in the Dubailand Development of the United Arab Emirates. According to Six Flags, the park (then dubbed "Six Flags Dubailand") was to be the largest Six Flags to be developed outside of the United States, as well as the first built by the company since Six Flags St. Louis in 1971. It was also to be the first of several products outside of the Middle East. The park was to feature thrill rides and live entertainment featuring Tony Hawk, which was a prominent license at Six Flags theme parks at the time. Groundbreaking was originally set to begin in early 2009.

In 2010, owing to financial difficulties, Tatweer failed to make due payment to Six Flags under their license agreement, breaching its contract. Six Flags then terminated the agreement, temporarily cancelling the project.

Project revival (2014-2019)
On April 10, 2014, Six Flags announced a new, separate partnership with Meraas Leisure and Entertainment to build a Six Flags-branded theme park in Jebel Ali with a scheduled launch date in late 2017.

On March 27, 2016, it was reported that the Six Flags Dubai theme park was to be in the second phase of Dubai Parks and Resorts and was expected to open in the third quarter of 2019.

On July 3, 2016, before the opening of Dubai Parks and Resorts in October, construction began on Six Flags Dubai and was expected to have 27 rides and attractions.
On October 24, 2018, it was announced that the future of the Six Flags Dubai project was "uncertain", following major losses at DXB Entertainments. On November 7, Six Flags issued a statement that management was reviewing the situation, and suggested that the park may be delayed past its original 2019 opening date. 

On April 25, 2019, the project was cancelled.

References 

Dubailand
Amusement parks in Dubai
Former Six Flags theme parks